Enzo Staiola (born 15 November 1939) is an Italian actor best known for playing, at the age of nine, the role of Bruno Ricci in Vittorio De Sica's neorealist 1948 film Bicycle Thieves.  He appeared in several other films including, in 1954, the American-produced The Barefoot Contessa with Humphrey Bogart. As an adult he became a mathematics teacher.

Selected filmography
 Bicycle Thieves (1948)
 Volcano (1950)
 The White Line (1950)
 I'll Get You for This (1951)
 A Tale of Five Cities  (1951)
 Black Feathers (1952)
 Guilt Is Not Mine (1952)
 The Return of Don Camillo (1953)
 The Barefoot Contessa (1954) as Busboy

References

External links
 

Living people
1939 births
Male actors from Rome
Italian male film actors
Italian male child actors